Easy Money is the nineteenth studio album of country music artist John Anderson. It was released in 2007 under the Warner Bros. Records label, and was his first album for the label since 1980's self-titled debut album. The album produced the singles: "If Her Lovin' Don't Kill Me" (previously a single in 2002 for Aaron Tippin from his album Stars & Stripes) and "A Woman Knows".

Easy Money peaked at 36 for country albums and reached 170 on the United States Billboard 200. Allmusic stated that Anderson pulled the album off "with ease" and that most of the album "feels natural and unforced." The reviewer stated that Anderson "hasn't made a record this good in years...at least [since] the early '90s, possibly the early '80s." The album was produced by John Rich of the duo Big & Rich.

Track listing
"Easy Money"  (John Anderson, Shannon Lawson, James Otto) - 3:43  
"A Woman Knows"  (Vicky McGehee, John Rich, Julie Roberts) - 3:31  
"Funky Country"  (Anderson, Rich) - 4:00  
"Bonnie Blue"  (Anderson, Troy Coleman) -  6:02  
"If Her Lovin' Don't Kill Me"  (McGehee, Rich, Tim Womack) - 3:03  
"Something to Drink About" (Anderson, "Wild" Bill Emerson, Jody Emerson) - 3:48  
"Weeds" (Anderson, Lionel Delmore) - 4:01  
"You Already Know My Love"  (Marcel, Trevor Rosen, Kevin Savigar) -  4:20  
"Brown Liquor" (Lawson, John Phillips, Rich) - 3:09  
"I Can't Make Her Cry Anymore" (Anderson, Lawson, Rich) - 4:08  
"Willie's Guitar" (Phillips, Ray Stephenson) - 3:34

Personnel
 John Anderson - lead vocals
 Brian Barnett - drums
 Dan Dugmore - steel guitar
 Merle Haggard - vocals on "Willie's Guitar"
 Tommy Harden - drums
 Wes Hightower - background vocals
 Mike Johnson - steel guitar
 Troy Lancaster - electric guitar
 Liana Manis - background vocals
 Greg Morrow - drums
 Willie Nelson - vocals on "Willie's Guitar"
 John Rich - background vocals
 Mike Rojas - accordion, Hammond organ, piano
 Joe Spivey - fiddle, mandolin
 Keith Urban - electric guitar, soloist
 John Willis - acoustic guitar
 Glenn Worf - bass guitar

Chart

Singles

References

2007 albums
Warner Records albums
John Anderson (musician) albums
Albums produced by John Rich